Sandrine Billiet (born 16 February 1990 in Bruges) is a Belgian-born naturalized Cape Verdean judoka who competes in the women's 63 kg class.

Career

Belgium
Billiet competed for Belgium at the 2014 European Judo Championships and 2017 Judo Grand Prix.

Cape Verde
Since 2019, Billiet has represented Cape Verde. She participated at 2019 World Judo Championships,

At the 2021 African Judo Championships held in Dakar, Senegal, she won the silver medal in the women's 63 kg event. She competed at the 2020 Summer Olympics held in Tokyo, Japan.

References

External links 
 

1990 births
Living people
Sportspeople from Bruges
Belgian female judoka
Cape Verdean female judoka
Olympic judoka of Cape Verde
Judoka at the 2020 Summer Olympics
Cape Verdean people of Belgian descent
Naturalized citizens of Cape Verde